Fresh is a 2009 documentary film directed by Ana Sofia Joanes. The film focuses on sustainable agriculture, and depicts farmers, activists and entrepreneurs who are changing America's food system.

Synopsis

Joanes sets out to profile people who are breaking away from conventional models of agriculture and food production. In the Shenandoah Valley of Virginia, Joel Salatin explains how he keeps his cows, chickens, pigs and natural grasses flourishing without using artificial fertilizers by closing the nutrient cycle. At Growing Power farm in Milwaukee, we meet Will Allen, who is turning three acres of industrial wasteland into nourishing farmland for his neighborhood. In Kansas City, David Ball breaks away from the standard concept of a supermarket by stocking his stores with produce from a cooperative of local farmers.

Reception

Critical response
Jeannette Catsoulis of The New York Times noted that the film "casts a sympathetic eye on farmers under contract to the giants of agribusiness," and is "less judgmental" and "more folksy in tone than the recent Food, Inc.." Mark Feeney of the Boston Globe wrote, "Fresh may be righteous (as well as right), but it’s not unrealistic," and noted that "not once in the course of the movie is the word 'locavore' used."

Awards

Official Selection
 2009 Environmental Film Festival
 2009 Newport Beach Film Festival
 2009 Maine International Film Festival
 2009 Kerry Film Festival

References

External links
 Official Website
 
 

2009 films
Documentary films about agriculture in the United States
American documentary films
2009 documentary films
Sustainable agriculture
2000s English-language films
2000s American films